Palafoxia arida var. gigantea, with the common name Spanish needles, is a variety of flowering plant from the sunflower family (Asteraceae).

Distribution
It is found in the western and northwestern Sonoran Desert of Arizona and its Colorado Desert subregion of southeastern California, and in northwestern Mexico in Sonora and Baja California  states.

It is most commonly found in sand dunes, and sometimes in riverine areas, including along the Colorado River, Gila River, and irrigation canals in Imperial County, California.

It is a California Native Plant Society listed Vulnerable species in California.

Description
Palafoxia arida var. gigantea is an erect, slender stem grows 30–60 cm tall, branching in the lower half and is sparsely leaved. It is glandular and hairy on the upper parts.

It has 2-5 inch slender leaves.

In the Yuma region of the Lower Colorado River Valley, in semi-shaded sites with annual but sparse rainfall, single plants can grow to be bushy and produce around 100 flowers.

The wind-borne seeds are dandelion-like, but larger and in a smaller quantity per flower. The plant with seed is easily identified since the seeds splay out in a flat circle until broken from the plant by strong wind. The seed is macroscopic in size, with about 10-16 seeds per circular flower-splay, each seed up to 0.6 in before the parachute.

References

External links
 Calflora Database: Palafoxia arida var. gigantea (Giant Spanish needle)
USDA Plants Profile for Palafoxia arida var. gigantea (giant Spanish needle)
 Jepson eFlora (TJM2) treatment of Palafoxia arida var. gigantea 
 U.C. Photos gallery of Palafoxia arida var. gigantea

arida var. gigantea
Flora of the Sonoran Deserts
Flora of the California desert regions
Flora of Arizona
Flora of Baja California
Flora of Sonora
Natural history of the Colorado Desert
Natural history of Imperial County, California